Neil Oberleitner (born 5 August 1999) is an Austrian tennis player.

Oberleitner has a career high ATP singles ranking of 967 achieved on 25 October 2021. He also has a career high ATP doubles ranking of 362 achieved on 25 October 2021.

Professional career

2021
Oberleitner made his ATP main draw debut at the 2021 Generali Open Kitzbühel after receiving a wildcard for the doubles main draw.

World Tennis Tour and Challenger finals

Singles: 1 (1–0)

Doubles 31 (22–9)

References

External links
 
 

1999 births
Living people
Austrian male tennis players
Tennis players from Vienna